The tongue is a muscular organ in the mouth of most vertebrate animals.

Tongue or Tongues may also refer to:
Language, a structured system of communication

Music 
The Tongue, or Xannon Shirley, Australian musician
Tongues (Esham album), 2001
Tongues (Kieran Hebden and Steve Reid album), 2007
"Tongue" (song), by R.E.M., 1995
 "Tongue", a song by Seether from the 2005 album Karma and Effect
"Tongues" (song), by Joywave featuring KOPPS, 2014
"Tongues", a song by Deathstars from the 2006 album Termination Bliss

People with the surname

People in law and politics 
Carole Tongue (born 1955), British politician and former European Parliament member
Thomas H. Tongue (1844–1903), American politician and attorney
Thomas Tongue (1912–1994), American jurist

Sportspeople 
Alan Tongue (born 1980), Australian rugby player
Nicholas Tongue (born 1973), swimmer from New Zealand
Reggie Tongue (born 1973), American football player 
Reggie Tongue (racing driver) (1912–1992)

Places 
Tongue, Highland, Scotland
Kyle of Tongue, a sea loch in Highland, Scotland
Tongué, Mali
Tongue of the Ocean, a deep water region in the Bahamas
Tongue River (disambiguation)
Tongue Wash, Nevada, United States

Other uses 
 Tongue (foodstuff), a dish made of a cow's tongue
Tongues (play), a 1978 play by Sam Shepard and Joseph Chaikin
 Tongue (Knights Hospitaller), an administrative division of the Catholic military order
 Part of a shoe to seal the laced opening 
 Part of a tow hitch device

See also

 Tong (disambiguation)
 Tung (disambiguation)
 Tang (disambiguation)
 Mother tongue (disambiguation)
 Old Tongue (disambiguation)
 Ice tongue, projecting out from a coastline
 Speaking in tongues, or glossolalia
 Tongue and groove, a method of fitting similar objects together
 Tongue-in-cheek, a type of ironic and sarcastic humor
 Tongue twister, a phrase that is difficult to articulate
 Tonguing, a wind instrument technique
 Tongue kiss or tonguing, an erotic act